Matt Cunningham (28 February 1934 – 2 December 2017) was an Australian rules footballer who played for the Fitzroy Football Club in the Victorian Football League (VFL).

Notes

External links 

1934 births
2017 deaths
Australian rules footballers from Victoria (Australia)
Fitzroy Football Club players